Fusor or Fuzor may refer to:

Fusor
 Fusor or the Farnsworth–Hirsch Fusor, an apparatus designed by Philo T. Farnsworth to create nuclear fusion
 Fusor (astronomy), an object that achieves core fusion during its lifetime

Fuzor
 Fuzors, a Transformers sub-line (toys, comics and cartoons)
 Zoids Fuzors, an anime

See also

 
 
 
 
 Fuser (disambiguation)
 Fuzer